Markaz Shabab Al-Am'ari is a football club based in Am'ari, a refugee camp in Palestine, that plays in the West Bank Premier League. Their home venue is the Faisal Al-Husseini International Stadium, which has a seated capacity of 12,500.

Honours
 West Bank Premier League
 Winners (2): 1997, 2011

 AFC President's Cup
 Runners-up (1): 2012

Asian record
AFC President's Cup: 1 appearance
2012: Runners-up

AFC Cup: 1 appearance
2021: Group stage

Continental results

References

Association football clubs established in 1953
Sport in Ramallah
1953 establishments in the West Bank Governorate
Football clubs in the West Bank